Buddleja curviflora is a deciduous shrub native to southern Japan and Taiwan, where it grows in thickets on stony slopes at elevations of 100–300 m.  B. curviflora was named and described Hooker & Arnott in 1838. Plants in Taiwan have been described as a separate species Buddleja formosana and assessed as Critically Endangered by IUCN, but the distinction is not recognized by Li and Leeuwenberg, who sank formosana as a synonym.

Description
Buddleja curviflora grows to < 2 m in height in the wild, its branches subquadrangular in section, and glabrescent. The leaves are opposite, lanceolate to ovate, 5–15 cm long by 2–6 cm wide, the upper surface glabrous, the underside almost glaucous.  The purple flowers are borne on slender, terminal, one-sided panicles 5–15 cm long; flowering occurs in June and July. Ploidy 2n = 38 (diploid).

Cultivation
The shrub is rare in cultivation. In the UK, specimens are grown at the Royal Botanic Garden Edinburgh, the Royal Horticultural Society garden at Wisley, and at Longstock Park Nursery, NCCPG national collection holder, near Stockbridge, Hampshire. Hardiness: USDA zones 8–9.

References

 Leeuwenberg, A. J. M. (1979) The Loganiaceae of Africa XVIII Buddleja L. II, Revision of the African & Asiatic species. H. Veenman & Zonen B. V., Wageningen, Netherlands.

curviflora
Flora of Japan
Flora of Taiwan